Gunnilda of Sweden ; Swedish: Gunhild and Gunilla even Gyda - may refer to:

Gunnilda, Danish and Swedish queen consort, 10th century (possibly same person as Sigrid the Haughty)
Gunnilda, Swedish queen consort 11th century
Gunnilda, Swedish queen consort 1585
Gunnilda, Swedish princess 11th century, Danish queen consort